The Kosar people are a group of individuals mentioned in the ancient Tamil literature.

In Tamil literature
In Akam 281, the Kosars are believed to be a North Karnataka power that had an alliance with the Mauryas.
In Tamil literature, Kosars were mentioned as west Vadukas with their origin as Kolhapur near Goa. Erattar were a branch of Kosars who became Maha Rattirar (Prakrit) or Maharashtrans (Sanskrit). Historian Burnell confirms this. 
Kosars were called Nar Kosar or Nanmozhi Kosar in the third Sangam literature. Nannul or Tholkappiam notes them as Kannadam (Kannadigas), Vaduku (Tulu), Kalingam (Oriya) and Telugu people. Kamba-ramayanam Payiram says Kosars were Vadakalai (Prakrit), Thenkalai (Tamil), Vaduku and Kannada people. Kosars were truthful to their kings and were called ‘Vai-mozhi Kosar’ (truthful in keeping their words).
The Mathurai Kanchi 508-09 & 771-74 records them as: 
"Poyya Nallisai Niruththa punaithar, Perum peyar Maaran Thalaivan Aka, Kadanthadu vai val Elampal Kosar, Eyaneri Marabin Vai mozhi ketpa" and "Pazhayan Mokoor Avayakam vilanka Nanmozhi Kosar Thontri yanna".
The Pandyan dynasty's Nedunchezhian's army head was Mohoor Pazhayan Maaran. Kosars were present in his army. They followed Maran's words in battle and were honored for their job in his court. 
Elampal Kosar (young Kosars) were present in the armies of the Cheras. 
Silappatikaram says Kon kilam Kosar were present in the Kongu Army (Kongu Nadu). 
The Prakrit form of Vai-mozhi Kosar is Saththiya Putthirar and Asokan inscriptions call the Vadukus by this name. 
The Akananooru 15, 2-7  records: 
"Thokai Kavin Thulu nattu anna Varunkai Vampalaith Thankum panpin Cherintha Seri Chemmal Moothur". (Then captured Kudaku Nadu and Erumai Nadu and settled in Tulu Nadu with Moothur as their capital).

Identification 
Krishnasami Aiyangar explores the Nalur Kosar, (i.e. Kosars who settled in 4 places: naal=4, ur=place) as foreigners to Tamil country. He suggests that they may be the Kosakara tribe mentioned in the Ramayana. The Kosars have also been identified with the ancient Khasas.

References

Sources
 Aiyangar, S. Krishnaswami. (1995). Some Contributions of South India to Indian Culture.  
 Akananooru 386.
 Nannul Noortpa, Page 272.
 Akananooru 205 
 buntsmathrsangha.net
 Kosar by R. Raghava Iyengar
 https://drive.google.com/file/d/0BzPRs9pD01zeWEVHQTd5M0pzZ1E/view?pref=2&pli=1

Social groups of India